The Journal of Behavioral Medicine is an interdisciplinary medical journal published by Springer, addressing the interactions of the behavioral sciences with other fields of medicine.

Bimonthly journals
Publications established in 1978
Springer Science+Business Media academic journals
English-language journals
Behavioral medicine journals